Moseley and Kings Heath is a ward within the constituency of Hall Green, covering the greater part of the Moseley and Kings Heath areas of Birmingham, England.

Politics
The Moseley and Kings Heath Ward Committee is part of the official structure of Birmingham City Council and exists to discuss issues which affect life within the ward, mostly (although not exclusively) related to the activity of the council. The Committee comprises the two elected Ward Councillors for the area together with the Member of Parliament for the Hall Green, Moseley and King's Heath, Sparkbrook, and Springfield  constituency, Roger Godsiff, of which the ward is part. However, meetings are well attended with all of those in attendance not only debating the issues of concern to them but voting on policy.

The Ward Committee works with The Moseley and Kings Heath Ward Advisory Board – a grouping of representatives from local groups and organisations – as a kind of executive for the full Ward Committee.

Moseley and Kings Heath Ward has adopted a Ward Support Officer with the current holder of the title being Muna Masood.

Demographics
The 2001 Population Census recorded that there were 24,273 people living in the ward. 31.0% (7,520) are of an ethnic minority compared with 29.6% for Birmingham in general. White Irish are excluded from these figures, however.

Transport
The Alcester Road (A435) passes through the ward and is major route linking the city centre with Redditch and the M40. The A445 and A4040 (Outer Ring Road) are also major roads in the area. Bus routes serving the area are the Number 1, Number 11, Number 35 and Number 50, operated by National Express West Midlands.

The Camp Hill railway line passes through the area however there are no railway stations on it. The area was served by Moseley railway station (opened 1867) and Kings Heath railway station (opened 1840), which were located on the line, however, these were both closed in 1941 along with the other stations on the line.

A reopening of the line has been considered by Birmingham City Council. A feasibility study has concluded that there is a strong economic case for reopening stations at Moseley, Kings Heath and in Hazelwell/ Stirchley. There was a recommendation against opening a railway station at Balsall Heath as it is close to the city centre, however, the report only looked at potential journeys from Balsall Heath going to the city centre and did not take into account people who want to travel to Balsall Heath from districts around the city.

Places of interest
The ward covers two conservation areas; Moseley Village and St Agnes. These two areas include many larger residential properties reflecting the affluence of the areas. Other areas in the ward are disadvantaged though.

There are several open spaces within the ward including Cannon Hill Park in Moseley, Kings Heath Park and the private Moseley Park. Within Cannon Hill Park is mac (Midlands Art Centre) which is a non-profits art centre. Other places of interest include Moseley Golf Course and the gardens of Highbury Hall.

Kings Heath and Moseley Village serve as shopping centres for the ward. Kings Heath Library serves the area and hosts a monthly local history group.

References

External links
Birmingham City Council: Moseley and Kings Heath Ward

Ward Description
The ward covers an area of {} Birmingham, including the districts of {}.

Ward Demographics (from the census of 2001)

Ward history
The ward was created in {}, with the boundaries being unaltered until {}.

Parliamentary Representation
The ward has been part of Birmingham {} constituency.

Politics

Election results

2000s

1990s

1980s

1970s

1960s

1950s

1940s

Former wards of Birmingham, West Midlands
Moseley